ULD can refer to:

 Unit load device, a pallet or container used to load aircraft
 Ultra Low Delay Audio Coder
 Unverricht–Lundborg disease